Orion Air was an airline based in Seychelles. The airline ceased operations in 2008.

References

External links

Defunct airlines of Seychelles
Airlines established in 2004
Airlines disestablished in 2008